The New Zealand AM class of electric multiple unit (EMU) was constructed for the electrification of Auckland's railway network. The class was introduced in 2014 with the first unit having arrived in September 2013. The units are classified AM (Auckland Metro), with the driving motor car with pantograph classified AMP, the middle trailer car AMT and the driving motor car without pantograph AMA. The trains are operated by Transdev Auckland for Auckland Transport under the AT Metro brand.

History 
In February 2010, an "industry engagement document" preceding the formal call for tenders was published, calling for 114 EMU cars in 38 three-car sets, capable of being coupled as six-car trains, the maximum Auckland's stations can handle. The tender also included 13 electric locomotives (which did not eventuate). The sets would have seated around 240 passengers. While the document specified only a small number of elements, it required a speed of 110 km/h for fully laden trains, a minimum design life of 35 years and the ability to climb the steep grades of the proposed City Rail Link. The expected value of the contract was approximately $500 million.

In December 2010, there was concern that government handling of the tender could be placing the process into doubt, with four tenderers out of the ten shortlisted having withdrawn. One of them, Bombardier Transportation, criticised the government for initially shortlisting four companies then extending it to ten, which in their view created a lack of confidence in the tendering process. Another criticism was that KiwiRail had "effectively prevented" their facilities in Hillside and Lower Hutt from tendering for the contract or parts of the contract, settling for encouraging overseas tenderers to include some local component. This, together with the refusal to allow local manufacturing to build railway wagons, was seen by groups such as unions and newspaper commenters as a sign that KiwiRail/the Government was unwilling to support New Zealand rail manufacturing.

In April 2011, it was confirmed that the shortlist had been reduced to two, with the contract expected to be awarded several months later. Still uncertain was ownership of the trains, with Auckland Transport preferring to take ownership rather than KiwiRail. The Rail & Maritime Transport Union favoured this course, as it would have ensured that they could not be sold by the government at a later stage. Auckland Council transport committee chairman Mike Lee noted that it would be inappropriate that Auckland would be expected to pay back a government loan for the trains (unlike recent Wellington train purchases), yet could end up not owning the trains.

In August 2011, it was confirmed that the tender specification had been changed to 57 three-car EMUs (approximately 50% more than before) and no locomotives, reducing long-term maintenance costs. All trains would be able to use the City Rail Link, which might not have been possible for locomotive-hauled carriages as they would not have met performance and fire rating requirements. The purchase price included a 12-year maintenance contract. On the funding side, after long negotiations between Auckland Council/Auckland Transport and the government, it was declared that the trains would be owned by Auckland, with Auckland paying approximately half of the cost from rates, as well as paying annual track access charges to KiwiRail and any potential purchase price increases as the winning tenderer was finalised.

On 6 October 2011, it was announced that Spanish rolling stock builder CAF had been selected. Further information regarding the trains was also released, including artist's impressions resembling the Class 4000 DMUs for NI Railways, built by CAF.

A mock-up was unveiled in June 2012, and was on display at the Museum of Transport & Technology. The mock-up is a hybrid of motor car and trailer sections - the actual layout is different, with greater length in each section.

Production of the first unit was underway in October 2012. In mid 2013, it was announced that the first train had been shipped, and was to arrive in Auckland by September 2013. It arrived at the Ports of Auckland on 24 August 2013.

The class was designed with the City Rail Link in mind, which will extend the underground operation of the 57 units and any future suburban stock considerably.

AT looked into the possibility of battery electric multiple units (BEMU) to operate services between Papakura and Pukekohe as an interim measure prior to electrifying the North Island Main Trunk between the two stations. It was thought that up to 13 2-Car BEMUs would be required (allowing for either 6x 3-Car BEMU per hour or 3x 6-Car BEMU with one spare). In November 2017, it was announced that the proposed 13-unit BEMU order had been cancelled in preference for 15 further AM class units. The rationale for this became clear in late April 2018 when electrification between Papakura and Pukekohe was announced as part of the $28 billion Auckland Transport Alignment Project. The 15 units were under construction mid 2019 with the first unit (AM810) shipped from the factory in Spain in early September. The first of the three-carriage trains arrived in Auckland in October and should enter service in December after commissioning. The last of the additional fleet of 15 arrived in Auckland during July 2020. 23 additional units with options for 5 more were ordered from CAF in January 2022.

Introduction 
The first unit was transferred to the purpose-built Wiri depot on 26 August 2013. It was certified at the depot before being officially unveiled on 12 September.

The next units arrived in Auckland in November 2013, with two sets due to arrive every month December 2013 - November 2014, four each month December 2014 - July 2015.
  The first revenue service ran on 28 April 2014 on the Onehunga Line, following a public open day the preceding day on which the trains were used to run free shuttle services between Britomart and Newmarket. Electric Eastern Line services commenced on 15 September 2014 as far as Manukau; Eastern Line services to Papakura were diverted to terminate at Manukau from 8 December 2014, completing the Eastern Line electrification.

Electric Southern Line services to Papakura commenced on 15 January 2015, running two return off-peak services on weekdays. From 16 May 2015, all weekend services, with the exception of the shuttle service between Papakura and Pukekohe were operated by electric trains, including the Western Line.

Electric trains were fully introduced into daily services across the Auckland electrified rail network on 20 July 2015. Electric trains operate as far as Swanson on the Western Line and as far as Papakura on the Southern Line.

Accident 
The front three cars of an inbound train derailed in the Britomart tunnel on the approach to the platforms on 9 May 2018 and stopped millimetres from a concrete wall. The emergency brakes were activated and no injuries were recorded. The derailed units took several days to clear. The TAIC investigation found that a manufacturing defect in a rail caused the rail to fracture.

References

External links 

 Auckland Transport - New electric trains for Auckland

Electric multiple units of New Zealand
CAF multiple units
Rail transport in New Zealand
25 kV AC multiple units